Geoffrey Ferreira (born 1 November 1949) is a Trinidad and Tobago former swimmer. He competed at the 1968 Summer Olympics and the 1972 Summer Olympics.

References

1949 births
Living people
Trinidad and Tobago male swimmers
Olympic swimmers of Trinidad and Tobago
Swimmers at the 1968 Summer Olympics
Swimmers at the 1972 Summer Olympics
Commonwealth Games competitors for Trinidad and Tobago
Swimmers at the 1966 British Empire and Commonwealth Games
Swimmers at the 1970 British Commonwealth Games
Sportspeople from Port of Spain